The 1956 New Hampshire Wildcats football team was an American football team that represented the University of New Hampshire as a member of the Yankee Conference during the 1956 college football season. In its eighth year under head coach Chief Boston, the team compiled a 3–4–1 record (2–1–1 against conference opponents) and finished third out of six teams in the Yankee Conference.

Schedule

References

New Hampshire
New Hampshire Wildcats football seasons
New Hampshire Wildcats football